The Capricorn Ridge Wind Farm is located in Sterling and Coke counties, Texas. The wind farm does not create any air and water pollution to the surrounding counties. It is a 662.5 MW wind farm, with 342 GE 1.5 MW wind turbines and 65 2.3 MW Siemens turbines that are capable of generating enough electricity for more than 220,000 homes.  With all four phases combined, there should be over 400 turbines after the project commissioned in 2007. The wind farm is built, owned and operated by a subsidiary of NextEra Energy Resources, the U.S.' largest wind energy generator who is also known for generating electricity using natural gas, oil solar, wind and nuclear. This company, together with it's subsidiaries owns, operates, develops, constructs and manages electricity and energy generating facilities in not only the U.S. but also in Canada and Spain. The project is part owned by San Antonio-based Sullivan Trillian Fund Private Equity. Its property Offtaker is Energy Market- ERCOT.

Facility details

The Capricorn Ridge's first phase began commercial operation in 2007 and the second phase in 2008, with it nearly jumping up to a capacity of 506.5 MV from 364 MV during the first quarter! The purpose of this project was to reduce the reliance Texas had on fossil fuels by producing renewable wind energy. Another pro to the wind farm, is that it would be boosting the local economy with more jobs and land lease payments with also maintaining the surrounding agricultural land.  It is in one of Texas' Competitive Renewable Energy Zones (CREZ) resource rich, high-wind areas in West Texas and the Texas Panhandle that will increasingly supply renewable energy to major population centers in eastern Texas via new transmission projects. Texas was also one of the three states that is the best to build turbines in with the other two being Kansas and North Dakota. The Capricorn Ridge project supply and provide enough clean and renewable energy to power an estimated 220,000 households, while it also avoids more than 952,000 metric tons of greenhouse gas emissions per year—equivalent to taking approximately 186,000 cars off the road—according to U.S. Environmental Protection Agency methodology. The Capricorn Ridge Wind project was the very first wind project in the United States to sell offsets that were verified under VCS (Verified Carbon Standard),   which happens to be based off of Kyoto Protocol's Clean Development Mechanism. Capricorn Ridge was included in two lists between the years 2010-2011. In 2010, Texas itself was rated as one of the states leading its way in installed wind power capacity by the Energy Efficiency and Renewable Energy unit of the U.S. Department of Energy with 10,089 megawatts. Capricorn Ridge itself in 2011 was listed fourth being one of the largest wind farms coming in with 662.5 megawatts.  

On 27 February 2012, GE Energy Financial Services and Lestis Private Capital Group announced that they had joined U.S. bank JPMorgan Chase to invest $225 million in the wind farm.

Capricorn Ridge Wind Warm is sponsored by Sustainable Travel International as an emissions reduction project, with proceeds from carbon offsets benefiting the project.

Electricity production

See also 

 List of onshore wind farms
 Wind power in the United States
 Wind power in Texas

References 

Energy infrastructure completed in 2007
Energy infrastructure completed in 2008
Buildings and structures in Coke County, Texas
Buildings and structures in Sterling County, Texas
Wind farms in Texas
NextEra Energy
2007 establishments in Texas